The white-throated towhee (Melozone albicollis) is a species of bird in the family Passerellidae that is endemic to Mexico. Its natural habitats are subtropical or tropical moist montane forests and subtropical or tropical high-altitude shrubland.

References

White-throated Towhee
Birds of Mexico
Endemic birds of Mexico
white-throated towhee
white-throated towhee
Taxonomy articles created by Polbot
Birds of the Sierra Madre del Sur